Susan Yeats may refer to:

Susan Lily Yeats, embroiderer, daughter of John Butler Yeats
Susan Pollexfen, married to John Butler Yeats